Roslyn was a parliamentary electorate in the city of Dunedin in the Otago region of New Zealand from 1866 to 1890.

Population centres
In the 1865 electoral redistribution, the House of Representatives focussed its review of electorates to South Island electorates only, as the Central Otago Gold Rush had caused significant population growth, and a redistribution of the existing population. Fifteen additional South Island electorates were created, including Roslyn, and the number of Members of Parliament was increased by 13 to 70.

Roslyn began as quite a large electorate, covering areas on the northern half of the Otago Peninsula as far east as St Leonards, Leith Valley, and western Dunedin suburbs including Roslyn. In the 1870 electoral redistribution, the area was reduced in the north (resulting in the loss of Leith Valley to ) and south-west. In the 1875 electoral redistribution, the area that has been lost in the north was gained again. In the 1881 electoral redistribution, the area reduced significantly and comprised western suburbs only; St Leonards and Leith Valley were both lost at that time. In the 1887 electoral redistribution, the area was further adjusted, but the electorate continued to cover western Dunedin suburbs. In the 1890 electoral redistribution, the Roslyn electorate was abolished and most of its area went to the new  electorate, with some small areas going to the three-member  electorate.

History
George Hepburn, the electorate's first representative who was elected in 1866, resigned in 1869. Henry Driver replaced him. Arthur John Burns was elected in the 1875 general election, and resigned in 1878. He was succeeded by Driver, who started his second period of representation that year.

Election results
The electorate was represented by six Members of Parliament:

Key

1878 Roslyn by-election

1871 Roslyn by-election

Notes

References

Historical electorates of New Zealand
Politics of Dunedin
1865 establishments in New Zealand
1890 disestablishments in New Zealand